Evergestis anartalis is a moth in the family Crambidae. It was described by Otto Staudinger in 1892. It is found in Uzbekistan, Kazakhstan, Kyrgyzstan and China. 

Adults are on wing from mid-June to mid-July.

References

Evergestis
Moths described in 1892
Moths of Asia